Aranđelović (also spelled Arandjelovic) is a Serbian surname, derived from the male given name and word Aranđel, meaning "Archangel". It may refer to:

Stole Aranđelović
Aleksandar Aranđelović
Ljiljana Aranđelović

See also
Arhanđelović, surname
Aranđić, surname
Anđelović, surname

Serbian surnames